Priyamani Debbarma is a former member of the Tripura Legislative Assembly and a member of the Communist Party of India (Marxist). He was elected as a member of the Tripura Legislative Assembly in 2013 with the ticket of CPI(M). In the 2018 Tripura Assembly election he was defeated by the BJP candidate Burba Mohan Tripura.

References

1974 births

Living people

Tripuri people

Tripura politicians

Communist Party of India (Marxist) politicians

Communist Party of India (Marxist) politicians from Tripura